Mario Junior Rondón Fernández (born 26 March 1986) is a Venezuelan professional footballer who plays as a striker for Liga I club Sepsi OSK.

Club career
Born in Los Teques, Miranda, Rondón arrived in Portugal at age 18, finishing his junior career with A.D. Pontassolense. He then proceeded to play a further four seasons with the third division club.

After scoring 11 goals in his last year, Rondón moved straight into the Primeira Liga after signing with F.C. Paços de Ferreira in May 2009. Rarely used in his debut season, he finished it on loan to Segunda Liga's S.C. Beira-Mar, featuring relatively as the Aveiro team returned to the top flight after a three-year absence.

Rondón returned to Paços for 2010–11. In the first game of the campaign, against Sporting CP on 14 August, he scored the only goal for a home win, eventually finishing as the side's top scorer with nine league goals and adding four in their runner-up run in the Portuguese League Cup (2–1 final loss to S.L. Benfica).

On 14 July 2011, Rondón joined C.D. Nacional on a five-year contract, for an undisclosed fee. He scored a career-best 12 goals in 30 games in his third year, helping the Madeirans to the playoff round of the UEFA Europa League.

On 28 February 2015, Rondón transferred to Chinese Super League newcomers Shijiazhuang Ever Bright FC. He scored the club's first-ever goal in the competition on 9 March, but in a 2–1 defeat at Guangzhou Evergrande FC.

In January 2018, after more than one year of inactivity, Rondón moved to Romanian Liga I's CS Gaz Metan Mediaș for the remainder of the season. He made 21 appearances and netted ten times in all competitions, with fellow league team CS Universitatea Craiova reportedly showing interest in signing the forward.

Rondón rejoined Shijiazhuang on 29 June 2018, aged 32. In May 2019, he signed a contract with Romanian champions CFR Cluj. He scored his first in Liga I for the latter on 23 February 2020 in a 2–0 away victory over Universitatea Craiova, adding another in the Europa League group stage against Stade Rennais F.C. (1–0 at home, where he was sent off after only three minutes on the pitch) to help his team progress to the knockout stages.

International career
Rondón earned his first cap for Venezuela on 25 March 2011, coming on as a 78th-minute substitute for Alejandro Moreno in a 2–0 friendly away win over Jamaica. He scored his first goal in another exhibition match, a 3–1 loss in South Korea on 5 September 2014.

Career statistics

Club

International

Scores and results list Venezuela's goal tally first, score column indicates score after each Rondón goal.

Honours
Beira-Mar
Segunda Liga: 2009–10

Paços de Ferreira
Taça da Liga runner-up: 2010–11
Supertaça Cândido de Oliveira runner-up: 2009

CFR Cluj
Liga I: 2019–20, 2020–21
Supercupa României: 2020

Sepsi OSK
Supercupa României: 2022

References

External links
 

1986 births
Living people
People from Los Teques
Venezuelan footballers
Association football forwards
Primeira Liga players
Liga Portugal 2 players
Segunda Divisão players
F.C. Paços de Ferreira players
S.C. Beira-Mar players
C.D. Nacional players
Chinese Super League players
China League One players
Cangzhou Mighty Lions F.C. players
Liga I players
CS Gaz Metan Mediaș players
CFR Cluj players
Sepsi OSK Sfântu Gheorghe players
Ekstraklasa players
Radomiak Radom players
Venezuela international footballers
Venezuelan expatriate footballers
Expatriate footballers in Portugal
Expatriate footballers in China
Expatriate footballers in Romania
Expatriate footballers in Poland
Venezuelan expatriate sportspeople in Portugal
Venezuelan expatriate sportspeople in China
Venezuelan expatriate sportspeople in Romania
Venezuelan expatriate sportspeople in Poland